Captain Bhagwan Singh (1916–1995) was an Indian diplomat, army officer, and administrator, who served as High Commissioner of India to Fiji, and subsequent to his retirement was prominent in Jat causes.

Family 
Bhagwan Singh's son, Ajay Singh, has continued the family tradition of maintaining links with Fiji, when he was appointed the Indian High Commissioner to Fiji in 2005.

References 

1916 births
1995 deaths
People from Agra
High Commissioners of India to Fiji
British Indian Army officers
Indian civil servants
Indian Civil Service (British India) officers